The 2016 CAF Champions League (officially the 2016 Orange CAF Champions League for sponsorship reasons) was the 52nd edition of Africa's premier club football tournament organized by the Confederation of African Football (CAF), and the 20th edition under the current CAF Champions League format.

Mamelodi Sundowns defeated Zamalek in the final to win their first CAF Champions League title, and qualified as the CAF representative at the 2016 FIFA Club World Cup in Japan, their first appearance in the FIFA Club World Cup, and also earned the right to play against the winners of the 2016 CAF Confederation Cup in the 2017 CAF Super Cup. TP Mazembe were the defending champions, but were eliminated in the second round.

Association team allocation
All 56 CAF member associations might enter the CAF Champions League, with the 12 highest ranked associations according to their CAF 5-Year Ranking eligible to enter two teams in the competition. The title holders could also enter. As a result, theoretically a maximum of 69 teams could enter the tournament – although this level had never been reached.

For the 2016 CAF Champions League, the CAF used the 2010–2014 CAF 5-Year Ranking, which calculates points for each entrant association based on their clubs’ performance over those 5 years in the CAF Champions League and CAF Confederation Cup. The criteria for points are the following:

The points are multiplied by a coefficient according to the year as follows:
2014 – 5
2013 – 4
2012 – 3
2011 – 2
2010 – 1

Teams
The following 55 teams from 43 associations entered the competition.

Teams in bold received a bye to the first round. The other teams entered the preliminary round.

Associations are shown according to their 2010–2014 CAF 5-Year Ranking – those with a ranking score have their rank and score indicated.

Schedule
The schedule of the competition was as follows. For the first time, some rounds of matches were officially scheduled in midweek (in italics) instead of on weekends.

Qualifying rounds

Preliminary round

Notes

First round

Second round

Notes

Group stage

Group A

Group B

Knockout stage

Bracket

Semi-finals

Final

Top goalscorers

See also
2016 CAF Confederation Cup
2016 FIFA Club World Cup
2017 CAF Super Cup

References

External links
Orange CAF Champions League 2016, CAFonline.com

 
2016
1